Camden Park is just outside the metropolitan area of Sydney, Australia. It was named after John Macarthur's estate Camden Park. While most of the suburb is farmland in Wollondilly Shire, the northern part of Camden Park has recently undergone suburban development as an extension of the suburb of Camden South. Camden South is in the Camden Council area and is part of Greater Sydney. The new development is named Bridgewater Estate and features a comprehensive Development Control Plan to guide the style outcomes of the locality.

Population
In the 2016 Census, there were 2,238 people in Camden Park. 86.3% of people were born in Australia and 92.9% of people spoke only English at home. The most common responses for religion were Catholic 38.9%, Anglican 27.6% and No Religion 16.9%.

Heritage listings
Camden Park has a number of heritage-listed sites, including:
 Elizabeth Macarthur Avenue: Camden Park Estate

References

Suburbs of Sydney
Wollondilly Shire